The Carmarthen Deanery is a Roman Catholic deanery in the Diocese of Menevia that covers several churches in Carmarthenshire and the surrounding area. In the early 2010s, the Aberystwyth Deanery was dissolved and the church in Lampeter became part of the Carmarthen Deanery.

The deanery is centred at Blessed Sacrament Church in Gorseinon.

Churches
 Our Lady of the Rosary, Ammanford
 Our Lady Star of the Sea, Burry Port
 Our Lady and St Cadoc, Kidwelly - served from Burry Port
 St Mary, Carmarthen
 Holy Cross, Pontyberem – served from Carmarthen
 Blessed Sacrament, Gorseinon
 St Bride's Convent, Pontarddulais - served from Gorseinon
 Our Lady of Mount Carmel, Lampeter
 St David, Llandeilo
 Our Lady, Llandovery
 Our Lady Queen of Peace Church, Llanelli - served by the Carmelites

Gallery

References

External links
 Diocese of Menevia site
 Our Lady Queen of Peace Parish site
 Burry Port and Kidwelly Parish site

Roman Catholic Deaneries in the Diocese of Menevia